Ahmed Samy Khalifa (14 November 1933 – 14 August 2015) was an Egyptian pediatric hematologist and oncologist. He established the specialty of Pediatric Hematology/Oncology at Ain Shams University. He treated thousands of children with thalassemia, leukemia and other hematologic and ontological diseases all over Egypt.

Education 
He received a Bachelor of Medicine and Surgery in (1957) from Cairo University, followed by a Diploma in Pediatrics (1959), a diploma in Internal Medicine (1960), a MD in Pediatrics (1961), and a Diploma in Physiology and Biochemistry (1964), all from Cairo University.  He was certified by the American Board of Pediatrics in 1974.

Scientific career 
 doctor privilege from 01/03/1957 to 28/02/1958 - Cairo University Hospitals.
 resident doctor from 10/04/1958 to 04/09/1960 - Children's Hospital and the paralysis Institute of Cairo University.
A.  Lecturer of pediatrics  from 18/08/1960 to 07/19/1964 - Department of Pediatrics - Faculty of Medicine - Ain Shams University.
 Lecturer of pediatrics from 19/07/1964 until 10/21/1969 Department of Pediatrics - Faculty of Medicine - Ain Shams University.
Associate professor of pediatrics from 10/21/1969 until 10/25/1974 Department of Pediatrics - Faculty of Medicine - Ain Shams University.
Professor of pediatrics from 10/25/1974.
Head of the Department of Pediatrics from 01/08/1991 until 31/07/1994.
 Professor Emeritus of Pediatrics from 08/01/1994 until 14/08/2015.

Scientific education 
Created the pediatric Clinic Hematology and Oncology, Department of Pediatrics - Faculty of Medicine - Ain Shams University in December 1974, after his return from the United States as a therapeutic progress of the Egyptian society and friendly countries and education for physicians in diagnosis and treatment.
 Visiting Professor at the University of Wayne, Michigan - United States of America.
External examiner at the Faculty of Medicine Dubai, United Arab Emirates and the Faculty of Medicine of the University of Jordan.

Awards 
 Holder on Nishan Republic in Science and the State Incentive Award in 1982.
 Recipient of the State Award in Medical Sciences in 1998.

Membership of scientific committees 
 He was a member of the Standing Committee of Pediatrics in different periods.
 was a member of the arbitration committee for the State Incentive Awards and discretion.

Supervised theses 
 85 Master in pediatric hematology and oncology in children has vacationed.
 62 M.D. thesis in pediatric hematology and oncology in children has vacationed.

Research 
 Published 219 research in local and international journals.
 Authored chapter on "Anemia in Mothers and Children in Developing Countries" in '' Maternal Child health around the World'' (1981) H.M Wallace and G.L. Ebrahim (editors) MacMillen Press London.
 Authored chapter  "Exchange Transfusion: Metabolic aspects biochemical changes" in '' Paediatrics and Blood Transfusion'' (1992) Smit sibinga, P.C.Das and J.O.Forfar (editors) Matinus Nijhoff. Publisher the Hague / Boston / London
Wrote Protocols of therapy for oncological diseases in Pediatrics (2012)

Membership of scientific societies 
Egyptian Society of Pediatrics.
Egyptian Medical Association.
 Egyptian Society of Hematology.
Clinical Society of Ain Shams.
 Egyptian Oncology Group in children.
 The Egyptian Cancer Society.
 Ain Shams Society of Medicine and the care of children.
 International Society of Hematology ISH.
 International Society of Pediatric Oncology
 American Society of Hematology (ASH).   
 European Haematology Association (EHA).

Scientific journals 
 Editor-in-Chief of the Egyptian children.

References

External links
Ain Shams Pediatrics department Official website
:ar:قسم طب الأطفال- كلية الطب- جامعة عين شمس

Egyptian pediatricians
Egyptian hematologists
Academic staff of Ain Shams University
Egyptian oncologists
Cairo University alumni
1933 births
2015 deaths
Physicians from Cairo